Bulacan local elections were held on May 9, 2022 as part of the 2022 Philippine general election. Voters will select their candidates of choice for all local positions: a town mayor, vice mayor and town councilors, as well as members of the Sangguniang Panlalawigan, the vice-governor, governor and representatives for the six districts of Bulacan and the lone district of San Jose del Monte City.

This is the first election to have six districts instead of four.

Gubernatorial and Vice Gubernatorial election 

The candidates for governor and vice governor with the highest number of votes wins the seat; they are voted separately, therefore, they may be of different parties when elected.

Governor
Incumbent Governor Daniel Fernando will run for his second term against his former political ally, incumbent Vice Governor Wilhelmino Sy-Alvarado.

Per City/Municipality

Vice Governor

With incumbent Vice Governor Wilhelmino Sy-Alvarado running for governor, his party has nominated former governor and 3rd District representative Joselito Mendoza for the post. He will be up against incumbent 4th District board member Alex Castro and former Meycauayan City vice mayor Salvador Violago.

Per City/Municipality

Congressional elections 
Each of Bulacan's six legislative districts and the lone district of San Jose del Monte will elect each representative to the House of Representatives. The candidate with the highest number of votes wins the seat.

1st District
Incumbent Representative Jose Antonio Sy-Alvarado is running for his third and final term against former Malolos mayor Danilo Domingo.

2nd District
Incumbent Gavini "Apol" Pancho is term-limited, and his party nominated his sister, Tina for his seat.

3rd District
Incumbent Lorna Silverio will run for her third and final term.

4th District
Incumbent Henry Villarica is running for Mayor of Meycauayan, switching places with his wife, incumbent Mayor Linabelle Ruth Villarica.

5th District
This is the first time the district will be holding an election since the redistricting happened, with incumbent Guiguinto mayor Ambrosio "Boy" Cruz running for the seat against Atty. Arnel Alcaraz.

6th District
This is the first time the district will be holding an election since the redistricting happened, with incumbent Norzagaray mayor Fred Germar running for the seat against former DPWH undersecretary Salvador Pleyto, former La Salle Lady Spiker Kaye Martinez Daly, and three other candidates.

San Jose del Monte 
Incumbent Florida Robes is running for her third and final term against former Mayor Reynaldo San Pedro.

Sangguniang Panlalawigan elections
All 6 Districts of Bulacan will elect members of the Bulacan Provincial Board. All districts send two board members each. Election is via plurality-at-large voting; a voter can vote up to the maximum number of board members his district is sending.

With the redistricting that happened, the 1st and 4th districts will no longer be able to send three members to the board, and instead two members will be sent to the board.

1st District 
Incumbent Board Member Allan Andan will be running for his third and final term, while incumbent board members Mina Fermin and Jong Ople will be running for their second terms. 

|-bgcolor=black
|colspan=25|

2nd District
Incumbent Board Members Pechay dela Cruz and Atty. Monet Posadas will be running for their second terms.

|-bgcolor=black
|colspan=25|

3rd District
Incumbent Board Member Emily Viceo is running for her third and final term; incumbent Board Member RC Nono Castro is running for his second term.

|-bgcolor=black
|colspan=25|

4th District
Incumbent Board Member Allan Ray Baluyut is term-limited; his son, Allen will be running for his seat. Board Member Alex Castro did not run for his third and final term, and instead ran for Vice Governor, while Board Member Jon-jon delos Santos will be running for his second term.

|-bgcolor=black
|colspan=25|

5th District
This is the first time the district will be holding an election since the redistricting happened.

|-bgcolor=black
|colspan=25|

6th District
This is the first time the district will be holding an election since the redistricting happened.

|-bgcolor=black
|colspan=25|

City and Municipal elections
The candidates for mayor and vice mayor with the highest number of votes wins the seat; they are voted separately, therefore, they may be of different parties when elected.

1st District
City: Malolos
Municipalities:  Bulakan, Calumpit, Hagonoy, Paombong, Pulilan

Malolos
Incumbent City Mayor Bebong Gatchalian is running for reelection against former City Mayor Christian Natividad.

Incumbent City Vice Mayor Len Pineda will be running for his second term.

Bulakan
Incumbent Mayor Vergel Meneses is running for reelection against Vice Mayor Patrick Neil Meneses.

As incumbent Vice Mayor Patrick Meneses will be running for Mayor, incumbent Councilors Aika Sanchez, Oya Mendoza and Berting Bituin will battle for the vice-mayorality race.

Calumpit
Incumbent Mayor Jessie de Jesus is term-limited, his brother, Municipal Administrator James, will run in his place. James will be up against incumbent Vice Mayor Aboy de Belen and incumbent Councilor Lorna dela Cruz.

Incumbent Vice Mayor Aboy de Belen will be running for Mayor; among the vice mayorality candidates are former Vice Mayor Zar Candelaria and incumbent Councilors Boy Lim Rañola and Jon-jon Mendoza.

Hagonoy
Incumbent Mayor Amboy Manlapaz is term-limited; his wife Baby will run in his place. Among the opponents are incumbent Vice Mayor Angelboy Cruz and former Vice Mayor Pedro Santos.

With incumbent Vice Mayor Angelboy Cruz running for mayor, the post will now be disputed by incumbent councilor Rey Santos and Ate Charo Sy-Alvarado, the daughter of incumbent Vice Governor Wilhelmino Sy-Alvarado.

Paombong
Incumbent Mayor Ann Marcos is running for her third and final term against incumbent Vice Mayor Maria Cristina Gonzales.

Incumbent Vice Mayor Maria Cristina Gonzales will run as Mayor.

Pulilan
Incumbent Mayor Maritz Montejo is running for her third and final term. Among her opponents is the incumbent Vice Mayor Rec Candido and former Councilor Puroy Valenzuela.

Incumbent Vice Mayor Rec Candido will run as Mayor; his party selected incumbent Councilor RJ Peralta as their Vice Mayoralty candidate. Peralta's opponent is Municipal ABC and Barangay Sto. Cristo Chairman Dennis Cruz.

2nd District
Municipalities:  Baliuag, Bustos, Plaridel

Baliuag
Incumbent Mayor Ferdie Estrella is running for his third and final term against incumbent Vice Mayor Cris Clemente.

Incumbent Vice Mayor Cris Clemente is term-limited and will run for Mayor instead. Vice Mayoralty race will now be disputed by both incumbent Councilors Madette Quimpo and Buko dela Cruz.

Bustos
Incumbent Mayor Francis "Iskul" Juan is running for his second term and will be up against incumbent Vice Mayor Arnel Mendoza.

With incumbent Vice Mayor Arnel Mendoza running for mayor, his party nominated Barangay Poblacion chairman Chito Hernandez for his post. He will be running against former vice mayor Loida Rivera, among many other candidates.

Plaridel
Incumbent Mayor Tessie Vistan did not seek re-election; her daughter, former Mayor Jocell, will be running in her place. Jocell will be up against incumbent Vice Mayor Mhel de Leon.

Incumbent Vice Mayor Mhel de Leon is term-limited and will run for Mayor. The vice mayoral post will now be disputed between incumbent councilor Lorie Vinta and aspirant Eddie Salonga, who lost in the 2016 elections for the same post.

3rd District
Municipalities:  Doña Remedios Trinidad, San Ildefonso, San Miguel, San Rafael

Doña Remedios Trinidad
Incumbent Mayor Marie Flores will be switching places with her husband, incumbent Vice Mayor Ronaldo Flores.

Incumbent Vice Mayor Ronaldo Flores will be switching places with his wife, incumbent Mayor Marie Flores.

San Ildefonso
Incumbent Mayor Carla Galvez-Tan will be running for her third and final term against incumbent Councilor Gazo Galvez.

Incumbent Vice Mayor Rocky Sarmiento will be running for his second term.

San Miguel
Incumbent Mayor Roderick Tiongson will be running for his second term.

Incumbent Vice Mayor Bong Alvarez will be running for his third and final term against incumbent Councilor Melvin Santos.

San Rafael
Incumbent Mayor Goto Violago is term-limited; his son, former Provincial Board Member Cholo, will be running in his place unopposed.

Incumbent Vice Mayor Edison Veneracion is term-limited; his wife Lyn will be running in his place unopposed.

4th District
Cities: Meycauayan
Municipalities: Marilao, Obando

Meycauayan
Incumbent City Mayor Linabelle Villarica will run for a seat as Fourth District Representative; her husband, incumbent Fourth District Representative Henry Villarica will be running in her place as City Mayor, against six other candidates.

Incumbent Vice Mayor Jojie Violago will be running unopposed for the second straight election.

Marilao

Incumbent Mayor Ricky Silvestre will be running for his second term against former opponent Atty. Jem Sy.

Incumbent Vice Mayor Henry Lutao is running for his third and final term against incumbent councilor Irma Celones.

Obando
Incumbent Mayor Edwin Santos is term limited; his wife Espie will run in his place against incumbent Councilor Ding Valeda.

Incumbent Vice Mayor Arvin Dela Cruz is running for his third and final term and will be up against the incumbent Mayor Edwin Santos.

5th District
Municipalities: Balagtas, Bocaue, Guiguinto, Pandi

Balagtas
Incumbent Mayor JR Gonzales is running for his third and final term.

Incumbent Vice Mayor Ariel Valderama is running for his second term.

Bocaue
Incumbent mayor Jose Santiago Jr., who assumed office upon the death of former mayor Joni Villanueva-Tugna, will be running for his full term against former mayor Eduardo Villanueva Jr.

Incumbent vice mayor Alvin Cotaco opted to run for councilor, and his party nominated former CIBAC party-list representative Sherwin Tugna, widower of former Mayor Joni Villanueva-Tugna, for the post instead. He will run against incumbent Councilor and former vice mayor Kennedy Valdez.

Guiguinto
Incumbent Mayor Boy Cruz is term-limited and is running as Representative for the newly created Fifth District of Bulacan; his daughter Agay will run in his place and will be up against incumbent Vice Mayor JJ Santos.

  
Agay's running mate is former vice mayor Banjo Estrella, who will run for the same post against two other candidates.

Pandi
Incumbent Mayor Rico Roque will be running for his second term.

Incumbent Vice Mayor Lui Sebastian will be running for her second term.

6th District
Municipalities: Angat, Norzagaray, Santa Maria

Angat
Incumbent Mayor Narding de Leon is term-limited, and will be running for Vice Mayor instead.

Incumbent Vice Mayor Jowar Bautista will be running for Mayor this time.

Norzagaray
Incumbent Mayor Fred Germar is term-limited and is running as Representative for the newly created Sixth District of Bulacan; his wife Merlyn will run in his place and will be up against former Acting Mayor Ade Cristobal.

Incumbent Vice Mayor Boyet Santos will be running for his second term.

Santa Maria
Incumbent Mayor Yoyoy Pleyto decided not to run for reelection; incumbent Vice Mayor Ricky Buenaventura will be the party's mayoral candidate, against former Mayor Omeng Ramos and incumbent Chairman Rey Castro of Barangay Manggahan.

Since incumbent Vice Mayor Buenaventura will run as Mayor, the party selected incumbent Councilor Jun Mateo as his running mate, which will be up against four other candidates.

San Jose del Monte City
Incumbent City Mayor Arthur Robes is running for his third and final term.

After winning the 2019 vice mayoralty race unopposed, incumbent City Vice Mayor Efren Bartolome Jr. will be running for his third and final term against two candidates.

References 

Elections in Bulacan
2022 Philippine local elections
May 2022 events in the Philippines
2022 elections in Central Luzon